Friedrich August Theodor Winnecke (February 5, 1835 in Groß-Heere, near Hannover – December 3, 1897 in Bonn) was a German astronomer.

Winnecke worked at Pulkovo Observatory near Saint Petersburg from 1858 to 1865, but returned to Germany and served as professor of astronomy in Strasbourg from 1872 to 1881.

He discovered or co-discovered a large number of comets, including the periodic comet 7P/Pons-Winnecke and the comet once known as "Pons-Coggia-Winnecke-Forbes" but later renamed to 27P/Crommelin after Andrew Crommelin, who computed its orbit.

Winnecke also compiled a list of double stars, the Winnecke Catalogue of Double Stars, in 1869. He also found a number of nebulae.

The asteroid 207 Hedda, discovered by Johann Palisa in 1879, was named after Winnecke's wife Hedwig.

References

External links
 
 
 F. Winnecke @ Astrophysics Data System

1835 births
1897 deaths
19th-century German astronomers
Discoverers of comets
Academic staff of the University of Strasbourg
Recipients of the Lalande Prize